The 66th General Assembly of Prince Edward Island is the 66th sitting of the Legislative Assembly of Prince Edward Island and the 40th since confederation in 1873. The membership of the assembly was determined by the 2019 Prince Edward Island general election, where the Progressive Conservative Party of Prince Edward Island led by Dennis King won a plurality of seats. With a victory in a November 2020 by-election, King's PCs became a majority government.

Seating plan

Members of the General Assembly
Cabinet ministers are in bold, party leaders are in italic, and the Speaker of the Legislative Assembly is designated by a dagger (†).

[*] Gallant is serving as the legislative leader for the Liberals, as the Liberal party leader Sharon Cameron has no seat in the legislature.

Party membership

Membership changes

See also
List of Prince Edward Island General Assemblies

References

External links
The Legislative Assembly of Prince Edward Island, government website

Terms of the General Assembly of Prince Edward Island
2019 in Prince Edward Island
2019 establishments in Prince Edward Island
2020 in Prince Edward Island
2019 in Canadian politics
2020 in Canadian politics